Nana Ama Agyemang Asante is a Ghanaian journalist, editor and writer. From 2012 up to the present day she has been working as deputy online editor of Citi FM's web portal citifmonline.com. She also co-hosts the “Citi Breakfast Show” at the Accra-based radio station Citi FM, together with Bernard Avle.

Biography 
Nana Ama Agyemang Asante was once the most abused female public figure in Ghana. As a journalist covering politics, gender and business, Nana Ama has been speaking truth to power and holding governments accountable for years. She has provided the much-needed feminist perspective on national issues and debates on radio. Even though she loves what she does, her high profile and feminist views have opened her up to incessant abuse and made her one of the most targeted female radio hosts in Ghana. That’s not stopped her from using her platforms to fight for the oppressed. Nana Ama is a fellow at the Reuters Institute of Journalism at the University of Oxford and the National Endowment for Democracy in Washington DC. Her most recent work was the Ghanaian Women Expert project, which tracked the number of women experts interviewed in Ghanaian media.

Education 
She completed her tertiary education at the University of Cape Coast where she studied Sociology and Economics.

Career 
Nana Ama Agyemang Asante started her journalistic career in 2006 as a broadcast journalist with the radio station Joy FM. From 2011 to 2012 she worked with Journalists for Human Rights (JHR), an NGO which was founded in Canada, where she served as the country director for Ghana.

The radio program “Citi Breakfast Show” (#CitiCBS), in which Nana Ama Agyemang Asante regularly participates, was awarded with a number of prizes over the years.

M24, an African entertainment network, named Nana Ama Agyemang Asante “Radio Personality of the Year” in 2015 for her persistent efforts in speaking truth to power.

In 2017, she was awarded a “Reagan-Fascell Democracy Fellowship” by the National Endowment for Democracy (NED), which allowed her to spend several months in Washington DC, USA to compile a report on the possibilities of the media to louden Ghanaian women's voices in the public sphere.

References 

Ghanaian journalists
Living people
Ghanaian writers
Ghanaian women activists
Year of birth missing (living people)
University of Cape Coast alumni